(born 1947 in Atami, Japan) is a Japanese scientist and researcher in the biomedical fields related to  biochemistry, endocrinology, metabolism, nutrition, pharmacology and toxicology.

Career
He graduated with a bachelor's degree from Shizuoka College of Pharmacy in 1971, and obtained his Ph.D in Pharmaceutical Sciences in 1976 in Japan. He was engaged as a research associate and assistant professor in Shizuoka College from 1973 to 1987, as assistant professor in the University of Shizuoka School of Pharmaceutical Sciences from 1987 to 1991, as associate professor in the University of Shizuoka's Graduate School of Nutritional Sciences from 1991 to 1993, and a professor at the University of Shizuoka Graduate School of Nutritional Sciences from 1993 to 2007. In 2007, Yamaguchi was invited as visiting professor to the Emory University School of Medicine in Atlanta, Georgia, United States, at the Department of Medicine, Division of Endocrinology and Metabolism and Lipids, where he worked until 2011. He received permanent residence in the United States in 2011. He collaborated as a visiting professor at the Baylor College of Medicine, Department of Medicine from 2012 to 2013, in Houston. Yamaguchi was then appointed as adjunct professor at Emory in the Department of Hematology and Medical Oncology from 2013 to 2016.

Research
Yamaguchi's research was focused on the fields of bone and calcium endocrinology, metabolism, cell calcium signaling, gene regulation, nutritional osteoporosis prevention, carcinogenesis, and cancer therapy. Yamaguchi discovered the novel protein and genes which were named as Regucalcin and RGPR-p117. Yamaguchi had over 20 patents, and has published over 550 papers and review articles, four books, and edited 10 further books. He served as an editorial board member on more than 80 international journals. Yamaguchi was appointed to the Japanese Society for Biochemistry and Endocrine Society for Japan. He was a member of the New York Academy of Sciences from 1996 to 2012, the American Society for Bone and Mineral Research from 1999 to 2016, and has been a member of the American Society for Biochemistry and Molecular Biology since 2005.

References

External links
Faculty profile

Japanese pharmacologists
Living people
1947 births
Academic staff of the University of Shizuoka
Emory University School of Medicine faculty